Levent Gülen (born 16 March 1994) is a Swiss professional footballer who plays as a centre-back for Polish Ekstraklasa club Miedź Legnica.

References

External links
 
 
 
 

1994 births
Living people
People from Aarau District
Sportspeople from Aargau
Swiss people of Turkish descent
Swiss men's footballers
Association football defenders
Switzerland youth international footballers
Grasshopper Club Zürich players
Kayserispor footballers
FC Vaduz players
Ankaraspor footballers
Volos N.F.C. players
Miedź Legnica players
Swiss Super League players
Süper Lig players
TFF First League players
Super League Greece players
Ekstraklasa players
Swiss expatriate footballers
Expatriate footballers in Liechtenstein
Expatriate footballers in Turkey
Expatriate footballers in Greece
Expatriate footballers in Poland
Swiss expatriate sportspeople in Liechtenstein
Swiss expatriate sportspeople in Turkey
Swiss expatriate sportspeople in Greece
Swiss expatriate sportspeople in Poland